Chrysochroa buqueti, the red speckled jewel beetle, is a Southeast Asian species of beetle in the Buprestidae family and tribe Chrysochroini.

Description

Elytra may be green to orange-yellow, with bluish-black markings, while pronotum is metallic red or metallic blue with metallic red areas on the sides. The legs are bright bluish-black.

References
 Biolib
 Zipcodezoo Species Identifier
 Encyclopedia of Life

External links
 Chrysochroa buqueti

Buprestidae
Beetles described in 1833